The 2001 Kangaroo Tour was the Australia national rugby league team's nineteenth Kangaroo tour of Great Britain. The truncated tour featured only the three Ashes series Test matches against Great Britain. The 2001 tour was almost abandoned due to military action in the wake of the September 11 attacks. Australia continued its dominance, winning two of the three tests against Great Britain and retaining The Ashes that they have held since 1973.

Background
The 2001 Kangaroo tour was initially cancelled by the Australian Rugby League (ARL) but after strong public opinion in both Great Britain and Australia, it went ahead. However, the only games played were the three tests, marking the  first Kangaroo Tour to not play against any British club or provincial teams. The 2001 tour was also the first since 1952-53 not to include a test series against France following The Ashes series.

Touring Squad
The team was coached by Chris Anderson who was making his third Kangaroo Tour, and first as coach, after playing in the 1978 and 1982 tours, the second in 1982 as a member of the famed "Invincibles". Team captain was Brad Fittler, the youngest ever Kangaroo tourist in 1990 at the age of 18, was making his third and last Kangaroo Tour after being part of the successful 1990 and 1994 touring teams. Fittler was also the only member of the squad that had previously taken part in a Kangaroo tour.

|- bgcolor="#CCCCFF"
| Player
| Club
| Position(s)
| Games
| Tries
| Goals
| F/Goals
| Points
|-
|- bgcolor="#FFFFFF"
| Braith Anasta
|  Canterbury Bulldogs
| 
| 3
| 1
| 0
| 0
| 4
|-
|- bgcolor="#FFFFFF"
| Trent Barrett
|  St. George Illawarra Dragons
| 
| 3
| 2
| 0
| 0
| 8
|-
|- bgcolor="#FFFFFF"
| Nathan Blacklock
|  St. George Illawarra Dragons
| 
| 1
| 0
| 0
| 0
| 0
|-
|- bgcolor="#FFFFFF"
| Danny Buderus
|  Newcastle Knights
| 
| 3
| 0
| 0
| 0
| 0
|-
|- bgcolor="#FFFFFF"
| Dane Carlaw
|  Brisbane Broncos
| 
| 3
| 0
| 0
| 0
| 0
|-
|- bgcolor="#FFFFFF"
| Petero Civoniceva
|  Brisbane Broncos
| 
| 3
| 0
| 0
| 0
| 0
|-
|- bgcolor="#FFFFFF"
| Brad Fittler (c)
|  Sydney Roosters
| 
| 3
| 1
| 1
| 0
| 6
|-
|- bgcolor="#FFFFFF"
| Mark Gasnier
|  St. George Illawarra Dragons
| 
| 0
| 0
| 0
| 0
| 0
|-
|- bgcolor="#FFFFFF"
| Matthew Gidley
|  Newcastle Knights
| 
| 3
| 1
| 0
| 0
| 4
|-
|- bgcolor="#FFFFFF"
| Andrew Johns
|  Newcastle Knights
| 
| 3
| 3
| 11
| 0
| 34
|-
|- bgcolor="#FFFFFF"
| Robbie Kearns
|  Melbourne Storm
| 
| 3
| 0
| 0
| 0
| 0
|-
|- bgcolor="#FFFFFF"
| Ben Kennedy
|  Newcastle Knights
| 
| 3
| 1
| 0
| 0
| 4
|-
|- bgcolor="#FFFFFF"
| Darren Lockyer
|  Brisbane Broncos
| 
| 3
| 2
| 0
| 0
| 8
|-
|- bgcolor="#FFFFFF"
| Jamie Lyon
|  Parramatta Eels
| 
| 3
| 0
| 0
| 0
| 0
|-
|- bgcolor="#FFFFFF"
| Adam MacDougall
|  Newcastle Knights
| 
| 3
| 2
| 0
| 0
| 8
|-
|- bgcolor="#FFFFFF"
| Brad Meyers
|  Brisbane Broncos
| 
| 2
| 1
| 0
| 0
| 4
|-
|- bgcolor="#FFFFFF"
| Jason Ryles
|  St. George Illawarra Dragons
| 
| 3
| 0
| 0
| 0
| 0
|-
|- bgcolor="#FFFFFF"
| Jason Stevens
|  Cronulla Sharks
| 
| 3
| 0
| 0
| 0
| 0
|-
|- bgcolor="#FFFFFF"
| Lote Tuqiri
|  Brisbane Broncos
| 
| 2
| 0
| 0
| 0
| 0
|-
|- bgcolor="#FFFFFF"
| Michael Vella
|  Parramatta Eels
| 
| 2
| 0
| 0
| 0
| 0
|-
|- bgcolor="#FFFFFF"
| Daniel Wagon
|  Parramatta Eels
| 
| 0
| 0
| 0
| 0
| 0 
|-

Ashes series

|- bgcolor="#CCCCFF"
| Date
| Opponent
| Score
| Ground
| Referee
| Crowd
| Report
|- bgcolor="#FFFFFF"
| November 11
| 
| 20 – 12
| McAlpine Stadium, Huddersfield
| R. Connolly (GB)
| 21,458
| bbc.co.uk
|-
|- bgcolor="#FFFFFF"
| November 17
| 
| 12 – 40
| Reebok Stadium, Bolton
| B. Harrigan (AUS)
| 22,152
| bbc.co.uk
|-
|- bgcolor="#FFFFFF"
| November 24
| 
| 8 – 28
| JJB Stadium, Wigan
| B. Harrigan (AUS)
| 25,011
| bbc.co.uk
|-

1st Test

Great Britain led 12 nil at half time but after the break Australia came back strongly. The home side were able to get the upset in the end.

2nd Test

After trailing 40 nil at half time, Great Britain's two tries in the final ten minutes were too little too late. The main contributors of Australia's victory were scrum half back Andrew Johns, who scored two tries and kicked all but one of the six conversions, and fullback Darren Lockyer.

3rd Test

For the first time since the 1986 Kangaroo tour of Great Britain and France, the Lions and Kangaroos had met in Wigan.

Great Britain scored the opening try of the match early in the first half, but by the break trailed 12-6 behind Australia. During the first half of the game, Australia's coach Chris Anderson suffered a heart attack and was taken to hospital.

Statistics
Leading Try Scorer
 3 by Andrew Johns

Leading Point Scorer
 34 by Andrew Johns (3 tries, 11 goals)

Largest Attendance
 25,011 - Third test vs Great Britain at JJB Stadium

References

External links
2001 Kangaroo Tour at rugbyleagueproject.org
2001 Kangaroo Tour at rl1908.com

Australia national rugby league team tours
Rugby league tours of Great Britain
Kangaroo tour of Great Britain
Kangaroo Tour of Great Britain